Judgement (or the American spelling judgment) is also known as adjudication, which means the evaluation of evidence to make a decision. Judgement is also the ability to make considered decisions. The term has at least five distinct uses. Aristotle suggested we think of the opposite of different uses of a term, if one exists, to help determine if the uses are really different. Some opposites will be included here to help demonstrate that their uses are really distinct:

 Informal – opinions expressed as facts. 
 Informal and psychological – used in reference to the quality of cognitive faculties and adjudicational capabilities of particular individuals, typically called wisdom or discernment.  The opposites are foolishness or indiscretion.
 Formal - the mental act of affirming or denying one thing of another through comparison.  Judgements are communicated to others using agreed-upon terms in the form of words or algebraic symbols as meanings to form propositions relating the terms, and whose further asserted meanings "of relation" are interpreted by those trying to understand the judgement.
 Legal – used in the context of legal trial, to refer to a final finding, statement, or ruling, based on a considered weighing of evidence, called, "adjudication". Opposites could be suspension or deferment of adjudication. See Judgment (law)#Spelling for further explanation.

Additionally, judgement can mean:
 Personality judgment, a psychological phenomenon of a person forming opinions of other people.

Formal judgement

So, to put some of the definitions together, we might say that we use the power or faculty of judgement to render judgements in seeking understanding of ideas and the things they represent by means of ratiocination, using good or poor discernment or judgement.  Each use of the word judgement has a different sense corresponding to the triad of mental power, act and habit, respectively.

This opens the controversy, however, of whether habits can even be classified or studied scientifically as well as whether there is such a thing as human nature.  It may be possible to state provisionally, though, that if human nature exists, it exists in the powers or, stated another way, human potentialities.

Judging power or faculty

Aristotle observed our power to judge took two forms: making assertions and thinking about definitions. He defined these powers in distinctive terms. Making an assertion as a result of judging can affirm, but also can in fact deny something, and it must be either true or false. In a judgement, one affirms a given relationship between two things, or one denies a relationship between two things exists.

The kinds of definitions that are judgements are those that are the intersection of two or more ideas rather than those indicated only by usual examples, that is, constitutive definition.

It should probably be noted that later Aristotelians, like Mortimer Adler, questioned whether "definitions of abstraction" that come from merging examples in one's mind are really analytically distinct from a judgement. So it might be cautioned that the mind may automatically tend to form a judgement upon having been given such examples.

Distinction of parts
In informal use, the words employed in the first main paragraph above are very often used with a great deal of overlap even when keeping them separated by the triad of power, act and habit.  Past thinkers, like in the example just given, have made observations in an effort to separate them further to help define what is meant by "judgement".

Aristotle also observed that while we interpret propositions drawn from judgements and call them "true" and "false", the objects that the terms try to represent are only "true" or "false"—with respect to the judging act or communicating that judgement—in the sense of "well-chosen" or "ill-chosen".

For example, we might look and say the proposition "the orange is round" is a true statement because we agree with the underlying judged relation between the objects of the terms, making us believe the statement to be faithful to reality, while the object of the term "orange" is no relation to be judged true or false, and the name taken separately as a term merely represents something brought to our attention, correctly or otherwise, for the sake of the judgement with no further evaluation possible.

Or we might see "2 + 2 = 4" and call this statement derived from an arithmetical judgement true, but we would probably agree that the objects of the number terms 2 and 4 are by themselves neither true nor false.

As a further example, consider the language of the math problem, "express composite number n in terms of prime factors".  Once a composite number is separated into prime numbers as the objects of the assigned terms of the problem, we can see they are, in a sense, called terms because their objects are the final components that arise at the point where judgements, like in the case of the "judgement of separation" kind of judgements described in this example, must terminate, the place where no further "judgements of reduction" of a certain quality (in this case, non-unity integers dividing integers into non-unity integer quotients) can occur.

Judgement in religion
 Christianity – Jesus warned about judging others in the Sermon on the Mount: Do not judge, or you too will be judged.
The Last Judgement is a significant concept in Christianity, Islam, Judaism and other world faiths.

See also

 Bias
 Choice
 Decree
 Discrimination
 Prejudice
 Presumption of guilt
 :Category:Judgment in Christianity
 General judgment, a Christian theological concept
 Judgment at Nuremberg, a 1961 American courtroom drama

References

Further reading
Zheng Wanga, et al. (2014).  "Context effects produced by question orders reveal quantum nature of human judgments".  Proceedings of the National Academy of Sciences of the United States of America, v. 111, no. 26, pp. 9431–9436.

Concepts in aesthetics